Peter Bieri may refer to:

Peter Bieri (author) (born 1944), Swiss author
Peter Bieri (politician) (born 1952), Swiss politician